Stephen West may refer to:
Stephen West (Maryland merchant) (1727–1790)
Stephen West (Nova Scotia politician) (died 1771), American-born political figure in Nova Scotia
Stephen West (designer), American knitter
Stephen H. West (born 1944), sinologist, philologist, and translator
Stephen C. West (born 1952), British biochemist and molecular biologist
Stephen G. West (born 1946), American quantitative psychologist

See also
Steve West (disambiguation)